A double international or dual international is someone who has represented their country at international level in at least two different sports. Such people have always been exceptional, and with increasing specialisation have become more so.

They are to be distinguished from people who have represented at least two different countries in the same sport. For those, see :Category:Change of nationality in sport.

See also 
 List of cricket and rugby union players#Dual internationals
 List of English cricket and football players#Double internationals
 List of New Zealand double-international sportspeople
 List of dual-code rugby internationals
 Brian Booth (born 1933), Australian field hockey player (1956) and cricketer (1961–1966)
 M. J. Gopalan (1909–2003), Indian cricketer (1934) and field hockey player (1935)
 Sir Everton Weekes (1925–2020), West Indies cricketer 1948–1958, Barbados bridge player 1974–1990

References

Sports terminology